Czesław Marian Główczyński was a Polish fighter ace of the Polish Air Force in World War II with 5 confirmed kills and one shared.

Biography
Czesław Główczyński was born in 1913. In 1935 he obtained his glider pilot license and began to study at the Volyn Cadet School for Artillery Reserve Officers (Wołyńska Szkoła Podchorążych Rezerwy Artylerii) in Włodzimierz Wołynski. One year later he entered the Polish Air Force Academy in Dęblin. In late October 1938 he was named second lieutenant (podporucznik) and assigned to the Polish 162nd Fighter Escadrille where he flew PZL P.7.

On the first day of World War II Głowczyński damaged a Hs 126. The next day he shot down a He 111 and a Bf 110 (shared with another pilot). On 3 September he scored a Ju 86 and three days later another He 111. During the September campaign he flew a PZL P.11. On 17 September Główczyński crossed on his plane the border with Romania.

He was interned in Drăgășani and in Turnu Sevarin. On 1 November he escaped and crossed the border with Yugoslavia then he arrived in Greece. On 28 November he sailed from Athens in the SS Pułaski to Marseilles.

In France Główczyński was posted to the I/145 Polish Fighter Squadron where he flew a Caudron C.714. On 9 June 1940 near Paris he shot down a Bf 109 and another one probably. The same day he probably destroyed a Do 17. On 19 June Główczyński was evacuated to the UK.

In the RAF he was ordered to the No. 302 Polish Fighter Squadron. On 17 August 1940, during a training flight his Hurricane caught fire for unknown reasons. Główczyński managed to land and run away from the aircraft before it exploded. Wounded in the accident, he spent three months in hospital. He returned to his unit in April 1941. He scored his last victory on 30 December 1941.

On 25 January 1942 Główczyński was sent to the Polish General Staff where he served as  Air adjutant to the general Władysław Sikorski. After Sikorski's death, he became the adjudant to the general Kazimierz Sosnkowski. In March 1944 he took a half-year study at Aviation School in Weston-super-Mare, then he served in the USAAF where he flew Republic P-47 Thunderbolt.

He was a co-founder of the Polish Air Force Association.

Czesław Główczyński died on 17 December 2000 in Warsaw. He is buried at the Powązki Cemetery.

Aerial victory credits
 Hs 126 - 1 September 1939 (damaged)
 He 111 - 2 September 1939 
 1/2 Bf 110 - 2 September 1939 
 Ju 86 - 3 September 1939
 He 111 - 6 September 1939
 Bf 109 - 9 June 1940
 Bf 109 - 9 June 1940 (probably damaged)
 Do 17 - 9 June 1940 (probably damaged)
 Bf 109 - 30 December 1941

Awards
 Virtuti Militari, Silver Cross 
 Cross of Valour (Poland), four times
 Croix de Guerre

References

Further reading
 
 Wacław Król, Zarys działań polskiego lotnictwa we Francji 1940, WKiŁ Warszawa 1988
 Bartłomiej Belcarz: Grupa Myśliwska Montpellier 1940. Sandomierz: Wydawnictwo Stratus, 2012  
 Tadeusz Jerzy Krzystek, Anna Krzystek: Polskie Siły Powietrzne w Wielkiej Brytanii w latach 1940-1947 łącznie z Pomocniczą Lotniczą Służbą Kobiet (PLSK-WAAF). Sandomierz: Stratus, 2012, p. 198. 
 Piotr Sikora: Asy polskiego lotnictwa. Warszawa: Oficyna Wydawnicza Alma-Press. 2014, pp. 322–327. 
 Józef Zieliński: Asy polskiego lotnictwa. Warszawa: Agencja lotnicza ALTAIR, 1994, p. 54. ISBN 83862172. 
 Jerzy Pawlak: Absolwenci Szkoły Orląt: 1925-1939. Warszawa: Retro-Art, 2009, p. 178. 

The Few
Polish World War II flying aces
Recipients of the Silver Cross of the Virtuti Militari
Recipients of the Cross of Valour (Poland)
2000 deaths
1913 births
Burials at Powązki Cemetery
Recipients of the Croix de Guerre (France)
Glider pilots